Niggo (died 5 January 1972) was a popular traditional Pakistani dancer and film actress. She mainly worked on Punjabi and  Urdu films in the 60s.

Early life 
Niggo hailed from Lahore’s red-light district. She was born in a small house there. Like many other women living in the red-light area, Niggo was a traditional dancer and earned her living as one.

Career 
For Pakistani filmmakers, red light district was the first choice for hiring talented girls for their movies. It was common for the girls to join Lollywood and become famous actresses. Niggo's career in the film industry started the same way. Her dancing skills impressed the Punjabi filmmakers and she quickly became a favorite. Because of her exceptional dancing skills, she was usually the first choice for the Mujra dance role in films. Her first film Ishrat was released in 1964. Niggo performed in almost a hundred movies altogether. She was the top item girl for most films.

Personal life 

While shooting for her film Qasu in 1972, Niggo fell in love with the film's producer Khawaja Mazhar. During this time, the couple got married. Niggo's getting married did not bode well with her family back home. According to old customs of Lahore's Shahi Mohalla, no girl from the red-light district could marry without her family being financially compensated. Niggo's family tried to bring back their daughter, but she refused to come back. To get her back home, Niggo's mother pretended to get sick and emotionally blackmailed her daughter to visit her one last time. Niggo visited her family, but was later brainwashed into not leaving. While her husband tried to convince Niggo to come back, Niggo due to her family's pressure, refused to return to her husband's home.

Death 
She was killed at her residence on January 5, 1972, in Lahore. Her husband, after trying and failing to get her to return home, lost his temper, drove to the red-light area and opened fire on Niggo at her mother's house. Niggo's uncle and two musicians were also murdered in the incident. Niggo's husband was sentenced to life imprisonment by the court in a public trial. The murderer died a natural death and was buried in his home town of Gujranwala. She was laid to rest at Miani Sahib Graveyard, Lahore.

Filmography 

 Ishrat (1964)

References 

20th-century Pakistani actresses
Pakistani film actresses
Pakistani dancers
Actresses in Punjabi cinema
Actresses in Urdu cinema
Pakistani murder victims
1972 deaths
Year of birth missing